Lee Gutkind is an American writer, speaker, and founder of the literary journal called Creative Nonfiction.

Gutkind has written or edited more than 30 books, covering a wide range of subjects from motorcycle subculture to child and adolescent mental illness and organ transplantation.

Currently he is Distinguished Writer in Residence at the Consortium for Science Policy and Outcomes and Professor at the School of Life Sciences at Arizona State University.

Early life
Gutkind was born on January 3, 1943, in Pittsburgh, Pennsylvania. He earned his bachelor's degree in English from the University of Pittsburgh in 1968. After high school and service in the United States Coast Guard, he held jobs as a truck driver, traveling shoe salesman and public relations account executive.

Career
In 1973, he published his first book, Bike Fever: On Motorcycle Culture. He then joined the University of Pittsburgh's Department of English faculty, where he eventually became the first tenured professor at the university without an advanced degree. 

Gutkind founded the literary journal Creative Nonfiction in 1993. He also published three issues of Best Creative Nonfiction, an anthology of creative nonfiction. At Arizona State University, he founded the ThinkWritePublish program, supported by The National Science Foundation (Science in Society) and the Templeton Foundation (True Stories About Science and Religion).

Gutkind has lectured about nonfiction to a wide range audiences and organizations, including the National Academy of Science,  Earth Justice, the Institute for Learning, the Council on Healthcare Economics and Policy at Princeton University, as well as foreign audiences.

He helped found the low-residency MFA program in creative nonfiction at Goucher College, and for 11 years was director of the Mid-Atlantic Creative Nonfiction Writers’ Conference there.  He was the director and founder of the "412 Pittsburgh Creative Nonfiction Literary Festival" for four years. He also served as the Virginia G. Piper Distinguished Writer in Residence at Arizona State University in 2007-2008.

Awards and recognition
Lee Gutkind's list of honorary achievements include : The Steve Allan Individual Award, by United Mental Health, Inc; Chancellor's Award for Public Service; Meritorious Service Award by American Council on Transplantation; Howard Blakeslee Award by the American Heart Association for "outstanding journalism; Golden Eagle Award by CINE, for the film A Place Just Right; Recipient of National Endowment of the Arts Creative Writing Fellowship.  In 2004, Gutkind was awarded an Honorary Doctorate of Letters from Chatham College.

In a 1997 snipe at Gutkind in the print edition, Vanity Fair called Gutkind "the Godfather" of the genre of creative nonfiction . More than 10 years later, Harper’s Magazine was quoted as having stated he was "the leading figure behind the creative nonfiction movement."

List of publications

Written

Edited

References

External links 
 
 The Creative Nonfiction Website

1945 births
Living people
Writers from Pittsburgh
University of Pittsburgh alumni
University of Pittsburgh faculty
Arizona State University faculty
American memoirists
American non-fiction writers